Kents Hill is an unincorporated village in the northwest corner of the town of Readfield, Maine in Kennebec County, Maine, east of the town of Fayette, with which the village shares a zip code (04349).

The village's name comes from the farmer who owned the land before Luther Sampson bought it to start Kents Hill School.

References

Villages in Kennebec County, Maine
Villages in Maine